Simon Lloyd may refer to:
 Simon Lloyd (priest, born 1756), Welsh Anglican priest who became a Methodist preacher
 Simon Lloyd (priest, died 1676), Welsh Anglican priest
 Simon Lloyd, musician with Icehouse and The Members
 Simon Lloyd, a character in the TV series MDA